Babek is a city, municipality and the capital of Babek District, in the Nakhchivan Autonomous Republic of Azerbaijan.

In 2015, by decree of President of Azerbaijan Republic, Qoşadizə village was liquidated and added into the administrative territory of the city of Babek.

History
Before 1978, the settlement was known as Tazakand. However, it was then renamed in honour of the medieval Persian revolutionary leader Babak Khorramdin who rebelled against the Abbasids. He became a martyr following his capture in the 9th century.

Demography
As of 2010, Babək has a population of 3252 people.

References

External links

Populated places in Babek District